This is a list of characters for the 34th Super Sentai series Tensou Sentai Goseiger. Much of the series takes inspiration from Japanese and Buddhist mythology in addition to western films for the antagonist factions.

Main characters

Goseigers
The Goseigers are young members of the  race, humans born with mysterious powers who moved to the  10,000 years ago so as not to cause trouble for regular humans. They are divided into three Tribes: the optimistic  with power over aerial elements, the tough  with power over the earth, and the calm-headed  with power over water.

To perform their mission, the Gosei Angels use the mystical  sealed away in Gosei Cards that are kept in the Gosei Card Buckle belts. The tiki-like  device allows them to transform and perform Tensou Techniques.

Alternatively, they also wield  sidearms that allow them to perform  attacks after combining it with a Headder and perform the  team attack.

By pressing a button and pulling the trigger on the handle, the Super Goseigers can perform standalone "Super Dynamic" finishers or the combined . With Gosei Knight's Dynamic Leon Laser, the Super Goseigers can perform the  finisher.

Alata
 is a member of the Skick Tribe and the childhood friend of his Skick Tribe partner Eri. He has the innate ability to see the true essence of things. Unlike her, Alata is ten times more sensitive to the wind and can easily pick up and track evil around the area. Like Eri, he also has a bubbly and positive personality. Whenever he is in a pinch, he never gives up and fights his way through. Alata truly believes in protecting the Earth and everyone. He is also the first to befriend and truly trust Nozomu. However, despite being a strong leader for the group, Alata is usually an airhead and often does things before thinking about them.

With Gosei Pink, he can perform the  attack.

With the Gosei Tensword, Gosei Red becomes , allowing him to perform the  attack and the  finisher.

Eri
 is a member of the Skick Tribe who is the most maternal of the group and optimistic about life. She excels in assessing situations and is a very bold fighter. Eri's personality resembles that of a cheerful and bubbly girl, as she is always thinking positively and never gives up. However, she lacks common sense and often clashes with her teammates, especially Moune, due to Eri's capriciousness and being an airhead.

With Gosei Red, she can perform the Sky Combi Break.

With the Gosei Tensword, Gosei Pink becomes , allowing her to perform the  attack and Super Sky Dynamic finisher. In Gokaiger Goseiger Super Sentai 199 Hero Great Battle, Super Gosei Pink can perform the  alongside Gokai Pink.

Agri
 is a hot-blooded Landick warrior and elder brother of Moune who acts cool. He prides himself on being the strongest fighter out of the five Goseigers.

With Gosei Blue, he can perform the  attack.

Moune
 is Agri's younger sister. Despite being the youngest member of the group and having a childish nature about her, she has a very strict nature, which clashes with Eri's capricious nature, though Moune can also be loving and always sticks to the battle ahead.

As , Moune can perform the  attack. With Gosei Black, she can perform the Land Combi Attack. With Gosei Pink, she can perform one of two attacks: Gosei Combi Sonic or Gosei Shining.

With the Gosei Tensword, Gosei Yellow becomes , allowing her to perform the  attack and Super Land Dynamic finisher.

Hyde
 is the oldest of the group and lone Seaick Tribe representative after the death of his partner Magis. Because he is the oldest, Hyde is wise and usually calm, often paying very close attention to every detail, no matter how trivial. He also serves in keeping the team together.

As , Hyde can perform the  attack. With Gosei Black, he can perform the Gosei Hurricane.

With the Gosei Tensword, Gosei Blue becomes , allowing him to perform the  attack and  finisher.

Gosei Knight
 is a mysterious silver-armored warrior of which the Gosei World has no record. Ending up in a glacier, Groundion made a pact with the Earth itself, which granted him the means to transform into a humanoid form to fight the revived Yuumajuu and cleanse the Earth of any threat to it. Gosei Knight's motivations initially put him at odds with the current Goseigers, as he does not care for Earth's inhabitants who pollute the planet. Over time however, he comes to realize the Goseigers share his mission and works alongside them to defeat the Yuumajuu.

When the Matrintis Empire attacks, Gosei Knight's life force starts to dwindle, leaving him unsure of whether he should continue fighting alongside the Goseigers. After Nozomu helps him realize humans have the potential to redeem themselves and protect the planet, Gosei Knight renews his resolve to support the Goseigers in their battles.

However, Brajira resurfaces and captures Gosei Knight in order to use the latter's Final Power for his Earth Salvation Plan. Using his Dark Gosei Power, Brajira reprograms Gosei Knight into  to serve him, but Alata uses his Gosei Power to expel the dark energy in Gosei Knight and replenish that of his ally's. Following Brajira's defeat, Gosei Knight leaves to rest and regain his full power.

During the events of the series Kaizoku Sentai Gokaiger, Gosei Knight supports the Goseigers and their Super Sentai predecessors during the Legend War before they sacrifice their powers to defeat Zangyack's first invasion force. In Gokaiger Goseiger Super Sentai 199 Hero Great Battle, Gosei Knight briefly regains his powers to help the Goseigers and Gokaigers fight the Black Cross King.

Unlike the Goseigers, Gosei Knight uses the mysterious , which allows him to utilize all three of Gosei World's tribal elements. With the Super Goseigers, Gosei Knight can perform the  finisher.

As the Groundion Headder, Gosei Knight can fuse with a haul truck body to form the lion-like Gosei Machine . As Groundion, he can perform the  attack.

Gosei Cards
The  allow the Goseigers and Gosei Knight to perform  once inserted into the Tensouder or Leon Cellular, with each member possessing his or her own copy. In Gosei Knight's case, scanning his Gosei Cards into the Leon Cellular is accompanied by him inputting a three digit code into the device. The Gosei Angels can only use the cards associated with their respective tribe while Gosei Knight has the ability to use all three elements and the Knightick power. In the film Tensou Sentai Goseiger vs. Shinkenger: Epic on Ginmaku, the Goseigers train alongside the Shinkengers to combine their Tensou Techniques and Mojikara respectively in order to fight against the resurfaced Gedoushu and the Ayakashi Makodama, who has the ability to counteract the Goseigers' abilities.

: Allows the Gosei Angels to transform into Goseigers and Gosei Knight to transform into the Groundion Headder and back.
: A card that allows the Gosei Angels to transform directly into Super Goseigers. A variation of this card type appears in Tensou Sentai Goseiger vs. Shinkenger: Epic on Ginmaku, which allows most of the Shinkengers to transform into Super Shinkengers without the Inromaru.
: Allows the Goseigers to summon the Gosei Headders, Gosei Weapons, and Gosei Machines, and Gosei Knight to summon the Vulcan Headder and the Knight Brothers.
: A card that allows the Goseigers to transform into Super Goseigers.
: Summons Gosei Wonder.
: Summons Gosei Ultimate.
: Activates the Gosei Dynamic attack when used with the Gosei Buster.
: Activates the Landsea Dynamic attack when used with the Landsea Buster.
: Activates the Sky Dynamic attack when used with the Sky Buster or the Red Dynamic when used with the Skick Sword.
: Activates the Knight Dynamic attack when used with the Dynamic Leon Laser.
: Activates the Miracle Gosei Dynamic attack when used with the Super Tensword.
: Combines the Gosei Machines into Gosei Great and Groundion with the Knight Brothers.
: Combines Gosei Great, Datas Hyper, the Skick Brothers, Landick Brothers, and Seaick Brothers into Hyper Gosei Great or Gosei Great and Gosei Ground into Ground Gosei Great.
: Combines Gosei Wonder and the Gosei Machines into Wonder Gosei Great.
: Combines Gosei Great, Datas Hyper, the Skick Brothers, Seaick Brothers, Landick Brothers, Knight Brothers, and the Groundion Headder into Ground Hyper Gosei Great and teleports the Shinkengers to the cockpit. This card appears exclusively Tensou Sentai Goseiger vs. Shinkenger: Epic on Ginmaku.
: Combines Gosei Great and Gosei Ultimate into Ultimate Gosei Great.
: Initiates the Gosei Giants' finishers.
: Initiates Wonder Gosei Great's finisher.
: Initiates Ground Hyper Gosei Great's finisher. This card appears exclusively in Tensou Sentai Goseiger vs. Shinkenger: Epic on Ginmaku.
: Initiates Gosei Ultimate's finisher.
: An "Enhancement" type card.
: A Skick card that turns the user into a whirlwind to move without being detected.
: A Seaick card that clears any form of interference, interstellar or otherwise.
: A Landick card that produces ivy from the ground to ensnare a target.
: An "Elemental" type card.
: A Skick card that allows the user to bring another object or person to him or her via a whirlwind.
: A Seaick card that summons several jets of water from the ground.
: A Seaick card that blasts a frost cone capable of freeze-drying anything in its path.
: A Seaick card that blasts a frost cone capable of freezing anything in its path.
: A "Spell" type card.
: A Skick card that summons a wall of wind.
: A Landick card that summons a wall of stones.
: A Seaick card that summons a wall of water.
These cards appear exclusively in the crossover film Kamen Rider × Super Sentai: Super Hero Taisen.
: An "Elemental" type card used for offense.
: A Skick card that summons a large transparent whirlwind.
: A Skick card that combines Kaoru Shiba's Modikara with Gosei Red's attacks. This card appears exclusively in Tensou Sentai Goseiger vs. Shinkenger: Epic on Ginmaku.
: A Landick card that lifts up giant rocks from the ground.
: A perception-affecting card type.
: A Seaick card that allows the user to assume a disguise.
: A Knightick card that merges Skick, Landick, and Seaick energies. Its effects can be duplicated through the simultaneous use of the Twistornado, Sparquake, and Presshower cards.
: A "Thunder element" type card.
: A Skick card that summons a storm cloud that fires lightning bolts.
: A Landick Card that produces electricity from vibrations in the ground.

Gosei Headders and Gosei Machines
The  are living head-like items that help the Goseigers, serving only those who share their common attributes.

 : Gosei Red's personal Headder. After combining with an airliner body, it transforms into , gaining fire breath and the use of missiles.
 : Gosei Pink's personal Headder. After combining with a fighter aircraft body, it transforms into , gaining the use of the Phoenix Beam.
 : Gosei Black's personal Headder. After combining with a Shinkansen body, it transforms into .
 : Gosei Yellow's personal Headder. After combining with a bulldozer body, it transforms into .
 : Gosei Blue's personal Headder. After combining with a submarine body, it transforms into  gaining the use of torpedoes.
Together, they are able to perform the  attack.
 : Four Headders resembling differently colored Dragon Headders in aqua, purple, orange, and yellow-green. They appeared only once as the result of Alata's Tensou Techniques being affected by Fandaho of the Nonsense and disappeared once the alien was destroyed.
 : A bullet-like Headder that allows Datas to transform into Datas Hyper.
 : A lion-themed Headder that can combine with the Leon Laser to grant it Gatling gun-like capabilities.
 : A duo of lion-themed Gosei Machines consisting of the blue cruise ship-like  and the red blimp-like .
 : Golden Headders that allow the Goseigers to become Super Goseigers and can combine with Gosei Ultimate.
Brajira attempts to use it against the Goseigers, but Gosei Red bonds with the Headder, convincing it to assume its true form and become Gosei Red's personal Miracle Header.
 : Gosei Pink's personal Miracle Headder.
 : Gosei Black's personal Miracle Headder.
 : Gosei Yellow's personal Miracle Headder.
 : Gosei Blue's personal Miracle Headder.
 : Gosei Wonder is a violet Gosei Machine that first appears in the film Tensou Sentai Goseiger: Epic on the Movie. It consists of five Headders and can separate into five Gosei Machines, which can re-combine to become Wonder Gosei Great.
 : A Header that can combine with a fighter aircraft body to transform into .
 : A Headder that combine with a Shinkansen body to transform into .
 : A Headder that combine with a bulldozer body to transform into .
 : A Headder that can combine with a submarine body to transform into .

Tensou Giants
The  refers to giant robots formed by the combination of Gosei Machines and Gosei Headders through .

: The combination of the core five Goseigers' main Gosei Machines.
: A pirate-themed formation with Gosei Great and the Seaick Brothers that grants analytical abilities and arm-mounted weapons.
: A samurai-themed formation with Gosei Great and the Landick Brothers that grants enhanced speed and kicking abilities.
: A unique gozuryu-themed formation with Gosei Great and the Exotic Brothers that grants increased defensive capabilities and an enhanced flame attack.
: A skydiver-themed formation with Gosei Great and the Skick Brothers that grants aerial combat proficiency and sonic attacks.
: A formation with Gosei Great and the Mystic Brothers, the latter of which form a left shoulder-mounted flail.
: The combination of Gosei Great, Datas Hyper, and the Skick, Landick, and Seaick Brother Headders.
: The combination of Hyper Gosei Great, the Groundion Headder, the Knight Brothers, and the Shinkengers' Modikara. Its finisher is the Modikara Headder Strike. This formation appears exclusively in Tensou Sentai Goseiger vs. Shinkenger: Epic on Ginmaku.
: A jet pack-themed formation with Gosei Ultimate's Machine Mode that provides a flight boost and use of the Ultimate Swords, which Gosei Great can combine into a bow.
: A hastily made formation with Gosei Great, the Taka, Sawshark, and Hammershark Headders, and the Landick Brothers.
: The combination of Groundion and the Knight Brothers. In addition to physical attacks, it can also fire  and perform the  finisher.
: A combination of Gosei Wonder and its corresponding Gosei Machines.
: A giant Gosei Machine that combines the Miracle Gosei Headders' powers, has the ability to travel between dimensions, and was originally intended to be the foundation of the new Heaven's Tower. It can switch between a battleship-like  and a robot mode. Armed with the twin . its finisher is the  finisher. While the Goseigers primarily pilot Gosei Ultimate themselves, Master Head can also remotely operate it.

Recurring characters

Gosei World

Master Head 
 is the leader of Gosei World and the Goseigers' contact to their home world who provides them with information to fight Warstar and later the Yuumajuu. To help the Goseigers defeat the latter, Master Head sacrifices himself to provide them with Gosei Ultimate. However, his spirit endures and ends up in another dimension. Playing a role in giving Gosei Knight the power to help the Goseigers defeat the Matrintis Empire, Master Head reveals himself when he temporarily possesses Professor Amachi to give the Goseigers insight about the Yuumajuu's sealing and Brajira. During the execution of Brajira's Nega End, Master Head possesses Gosei Ultimate in a vain attempt to halt the wedges alongside Gosei Ground and Datas Hyper.

Datas 
 is a Super Sentai Battle: Dice-O arcade machine-esque robot that Master Head sent to Earth prior to the destruction of the Heaven's Tower to serve as an emergency system and means for communication between Gosei World and Earth. Tending to end his sentences with "desu" and usually sleeping when not needed, Datas also can pinpoint the likely location of villain activity.

Additionally, Datas can combine with the Mystic Brothers to form , gaining flight capabilities and the ability to fire energy bullets.

Amachi Astronomical Institute 
The  is the home of the Goseigers' friend Nozomu and his father Professor Shuichirou Amachi, whom the Goseigers work for part-time.

Nozomu Amachi 
 is a grade four student and Alata's good friend. He first meets Alata when the Goseiger stops a baby carriage from rolling down a flight of stairs. After their first encounter, Alata leaves to rejoin his teammates, but forgets his Change Card, which Nozomu returns later during the Goseigers' first fight with Warstar's forces. While the Goseigers are meant to keep their existence a secret, Alata convinces his teammates not to erase Nozomu's memory. Following this, Nozomu becomes a close ally to the Goseigers amidst their later battles with Warstar, the Yuumajuu, the Matrintis Empire, and Brajira.

Shuichirou Amachi 
 is an amateur astronomer who runs the Amachi Institute, Nozomu's father, and only present parent as his wife  works away from home and rarely comes home. He hires the Goseigers as part-time workers, unaware of their actions. Regardless, Amachi aids them on certain occasions and eventually learns the truth about the Gosei Angels from Master Head after agreeing to be the latter's medium.

Wicked Souls
Unlike most Super Sentai installments, this series lacks a permanent antagonist faction as the Goseigers fight three different villain groups that appear one after another before Brajira rises up as the series' final antagonist. All of the villains in this series are named after popular films, with each faction representing different film genres. While they lack a collective name, the Goseigers referred to them as  before they executed them in reference to their roles as Gosei Angels to punish the wicked.

Warstar
The  are the first set of antagonists that battle the Goseigers who seek to steal the life force of other planets, with Earth as their latest target.

Before their invasion of Earth, they realized that the Gosei Angels could potentially jeopardize their plans and destroy the Heaven's Tower in a preemptive strike. Unbeknownst to them however, five Gosei Angels were living on Earth at the time and go on to eventually defeat them.

Mons Drake
Before invading Earth, his new follower Brajira informs him of the Gosei Angels and the threat that they pose to his plans, so Mons Drake tasks Dereputa with destroying Heaven's Tower in an attempt to bar the Gosei Angels from Earth. However, as five Gosei Angels were on the planet at the time, Mons Drake orders his forces to stop them. Eventually, due to the Goseigers' constant interference, Mons Drake performs the Gravity Fall ritual to make the Moon collide with Earth, only for the Goseigers to foil this plan and seemingly kill Dereputa. Following this, Mons Drake attempts to transfer Earth's oxygen into the Indevader and have it crash into the Earth to burn every human and enlarge himself to ensure the Goseigers cannot stop him, but the Goseigers blast him into the Indevader, which consumes Mons Drake in the resulting explosion.

His most powerful attack is the  ceremony, wherein he uses stored dark matter in his body to cause a nearby natural satellite to impact the planet he is currently on.

Dereputa
Dereputa personally destroys Heaven's Tower to facilitate Warstar's invasion, but is severely injured in battle with Alata and develops a vendetta against him. Dereputa goes on to fight the Goseigers until he is seemingly killed while helping Mons Drake enact the Gravity Fall ceremony. Barely surviving, Dereputa temporarily goes into hiding, realizing he needs to act alone to prove his superiority. Following Mons Drake's demise, Dereputa resurfaces to attack the Goseigers and settle his rivalry with Alata. Dereputa is killed in battle, but unknowingly releases the Yuumajuu.

Aliens
The  are monsters from different planets that serve Warstar whose full names relate to their talents. With the use of Brajira's Bibi Bugs, they are able to enlarge.

: A  capable of absorbing rubble into his stomach grinder to create boulders to attack or capture opponents. He is summoned for Warstar's initial attack on Earth before the Goseigers destroy him.
: A  who can transform into a UFO and duplicate himself so he can abduct people in order to make money off of them. He is defeated by the Goseigers, enlarged by Brajira, and destroyed by Gosei Great.
: A  with cryokinetic powers. He is defeated by the Goseigers, enlarged by Brajira, and destroyed by Gosei Great.
: A  who considers himself the universe's best musician even though the sound he produces is painful to human ears and more so to the Skick Tribe Gosei Angels. With Brajira as his manager, Mazuarta almost kills everyone with his music until Eri's singing negates his sound. Mazuarta is destroyed by the Goseigers, enlarged by Brajira, and destroyed by Gosei Great.
: A  capable of producing a virus that changes smart students into Bibi soldiers. After the Goseigers devise an antidote, they defeat Ucyuseruzo, who is enlarged by Brajira and destroyed by Seaick Gosei Great.
: A  who possesses superhuman speed. While Alata is able to counter him with his enhanced hearing, Dereputa separates the Gosei Angel from the others. In response, the remaining Goseigers train to master Alata's hearing ability so they can counter Hidou's speed. Hidou is defeated by the Goseigers, enlarged by Brajira, and destroyed by Landick Gosei Great.
: A  capable of observing and researching an opponent in order to counter them. Abauta is destroyed by Landick Gosei Great.
: A  capable of scrambling targets with his back-mounted antennae. Going to Earth on his own, Fandaho attempts to make an impression on Mons Drake by causing chaos. However, he is destroyed by Exotic Gosei Great.
: A  capable of producing a fluid that paralyzes male targets, allowing her to use them as material for her furniture. Irian is defeated by the female Goseigers, enlarged by Brajira, and destroyed by Skick Gosei Great.
While Dereputa was sent to destroy the Heaven's Tower, Kurasunigo was sent to boil the Earth's oceans before he was seemingly killed by Magis. Despite this, Kurasunigo reemerges months later to resume his mission. Kurasunigo is defeated by the Goseigers, enlarged by Brajira, and destroyed by Seaick Gosei Great.
: A  who can absorb and manipulate electricity and is considered one of Mons Drake's top soldiers. He is sent to Earth to commit acts of destruction via his powers, but the Goseigers defeat him. After being enlarged by Brajira, Yokubabanger siphons Gosei Great's power before he is destroyed by Datas Hyper.
: A  who uses modified  created by Brajira to counter the Goseigers' attacks and wields his own version of the Skick Sword. After being defeated by the Mystic Brothers, an enlarged Powereddark is destroyed by Mystic Gosei Great.
: A  who specializes in teleportation and is also considered one of Mons Drake's top soldiers. Targate offers his aid in eliminating the Goseigers after being promised the apparently fallen Dereputa's position as his leader's right hand. After Targate withstands the Gosei Buster, the Goseigers use the Sky-Land-Sea Bullet attack to defeat him before Brajira enlarges him and the Goseigers use Mystic Gosei Great and Datas Hyper to destroy Targate.

Other Aliens
: An Alien capable of resurrecting fallen monsters who is also considered one of Mons Drake's top soldiers. He uses his powers to resurrect several fallen Aliens, only to be destroyed by Gosei Great. Dorunpasu appears exclusively in the special drama sessions of the first original soundtrack.

Yuumajuu
The  are the second set of antagonists to battle the Goseigers who seek to pollute the Earth and make it an ideal paradise for themselves. Similarly to the Warstar, each of the Yuumajuu's names are a modification of monster movie titles while each member is modeled after a specific cryptid, horror film creature, and arthropod.

In the present, Dereputa unknowingly exposes the Erurei Box, allowing Brajira to secretly break the seal and rejoin them in his Buredoran guise.

Makuin
 is the earthworm-themed leader of the Yuumajuu who wishes to reform the world in his image so his kind can flourish and takes delight in human suffering. While enacting the Yuumajuu's final plan, Makuin is apparently destroyed by Ground Gosei Great. After the box is enlarged and placed on top of the Tokyo Metropolitan Government Building, Makuin attempts to absorb the Earth. However, the Goseigers travel inside the box and eventually reach his core so they can permanently kill him.

In battle, he can use his  cane to perform spells and manipulate his gelatinous body.

Kinggon
 is the tarantula-themed military leader of the Yuumajuu and one of their strongest warriors who tends to say certain words in a sentence three times. Due to Kinggon and Makuin's combat efficiency while working together, Brajira secretly manipulates the former into proving his superiority over the latter by fighting the Goseigers alone in the hopes of eliminating Kinggon. However, Kinggon sees through the deception, goes into hiding to locate the Bibi Bugs' hive, and eventually resurfaces to kill Brajira before attempting to assist Makuin in their plan to absorb the Earth. After the Goseigers kill Makuin, Kinggon uses the Bibi Bugs to enlarge himself, only to killed by Gosei Ultimate.

In battle, Kinggon possesses incredible strength and wields the  kanabō.

Minor Yuumajuu
The minor  are cryptid/arthropod-themed monsters who avoided Makuin and Kinggon's fates by hiding within different parts of the Earth before resurfacing once their leaders are released. Their full name relates to the cryptids on which they are based on. Like the aliens of Warstar, the Yuumajuu are also able to enlarge with the use of Brajira's Bibi Bugs.

: The first Yuumajuu to attack, the common pill-bug-themed Tomarezu is able to dig underground and spew a green slime that can melt humans down into a toxic sludge which will seep into the Earth and taint it unless he is destroyed. After being destroyed by Gosei Knight, Tomarezu is secretly revived by Brajira and enlarged, gaining the ability turn into a tank-like form. However, he is destroyed by Groundion.
: A centipede-themed Yuumajuu who wields the Cursed Sand and the Cursed Whip and is capable of turning people into his mummified slaves. He plots to use a television broadcast to turn more humans into his slaves and mummify the entire planet until the Goseigers and Gosei Knight stop him. Following this, Zeibu is revived and enlarged by Brajira and destroyed by Hyper Gosei Great.
: A tick-themed Yuumajuu warrior with the ability to absorb moisture and a sumo wrestler-esque fighting style. After being found by Brajira, Giemurou is used in a scheme to use Gosei Knight's power to convert humans into kappas and have them convert others as well, all while draining the planet. However, Gosei Knight escapes his confines and defeats Giemurou. While Brajira enlarges the latter, Giemurou is destroyed by Gosei Ground.
: A leech-themed Yuumajuu who feeds off of the persistent love between humans, possesses superhuman speed, and can break up his body into several fluff balls. After Makuin reconstructs him, Pesaranza drives humans to become obsessive and suitable for feeding. However, Pesaranza is defeated by the Goseigers and Gosei Knight, enlarged by Brajira, and destroyed by Gosei Ground and Skick Gosei Great.
: A childish, flea-themed Yuumajuu capable of destroying mechanical objects. He is defeated by the Goseigers, enlarged by Brajira, and destroyed by Gosei Ground and Gosei Great.
: A snail-themed Yuumajuu who speaks in poems and eats shadows, leaving his victims in a state of paralysis that becomes fatal over time. Having battled Groundion in the past, Makuin finds Uobouzu in the present and asks for his help in settling the battle. Uobouzu is defeated by Gosei Knight, enlarged by Brajira, and destroyed by Ground Gosei Great.
He is defeated by the male Goseigers, enlarged by Brajira, and destroyed by Ground Gosei Great.
: A harvestman-themed Yuumajuu capable of casting illusions. Brajira uses him to manipulate the Goseigers into locating the Abare Header, which he uses to enhance Semattarei's powers and make his illusions tangible. Despite this, Semattarei is destroyed by the Super Goseigers.
: A leaf insect-themed Yuumajuu who uses golden pixie dust to assume disguises. Makuin tasks her with pretending to be Moune's mother. However, Moune eventually sees through the deception with Gosei Knight's help. Sarawareteiru is defeated by the Super Goseigers and Gosei Knight, enlarged by Brajira, and destroyed by Ground Gosei Great.
: A scorpion-themed Yuumajuu who wields feathered gauntlets that allow him to perform wind attacks, such as the "Tickling Wind", and a gourd capable of engulfing anyone who laughs in its presence. Despising human laughter, Hit enacts a scheme to rid the world of laughter. After capturing most of the Goseigers, Gosei Blue and Knight trick the Yuumajuu into breaking his gourd and freeing his captives before defeating him. After being enlarged, Hit is weakened by Seaick Gosei Great and destroyed by Gosei Ground.
: A silverfish-themed Yuumajuu and an old friend of Kinggon's who wields seashells that, when latched onto a victim, target one of their flaws and make them believe everyone around them is talking about it behind their back. Kinggon brings in Jogon to replace Brajira for failing the Yuumajuu, but Brajira attempts to use Jogon to kill Kinggon. Jogon is defeated by the Super Goseigers, enlarged by Brajira, and destroyed by Landick Gosei Great.
: An ant-themed Yuumajuu and an old friend of Makuin's with hypnotic powers. Makuin summons her to abduct children and make them jump off a cliff with the promise of becoming his new second-in-command. After Shuichirou Amachi breaks her spell, Pikarime is defeated by the Super Goseigers, enlarged by Brajira, and destroyed by Ground Gosei Great.
: A velvet worm-themed Yuumajuu capable of eating sleeping victims' dreams. After Makuin and Kinggon use the Erurei Box to enhance his powers, Elmgaim gains the ability to eat souls and leave his victims trapped in a nightmare world while their comatose bodies sprout roots capable of rotting the planet. Elmgaim is defeated by Super Gosei Pink and Gosei Knight, enlarged by Brajira, and destroyed by Ground Gosei Great.

Other Yuumajuu
: A Yuumajuu with aerokinesis and invisibility. He is defeated by Gosei Knight, enlarged by Brajira, and destroyed by Ground Gosei Great. Beetuice appears exclusively in the special drama sessions of the series' third original soundtrack.

Matrintis
The  are the third set of antagonists that the Goseigers fight. Similarly to Warstar and the Yuumajuu, Matrintis' forces are named after films that feature robots, are modeled after marine invertebrates, and their names feature non-Japanese characters.

After an ancient empire sank into the sea 4500 years ago following an unknown event, the cybernetically modified sole survivor and his robotic creations took refuge in the  before emerging in the present to enslave humanity after studying the Goseigers' battles with Warstar and the Yuumajuu following a failed attempt to secure an energy source in the Kaizoku Sentai Gokaiger episode "The Future Is In the Past".

Robogorg
 is the shrimp-themed leader of the Matrintis Empire who was originally a human scientist who perfected a method of immortality through cybernetics and uploading his mind into a Matroid body. Though he was ostracized for his methods prior to converting himself, the Matrintians begged him for his help when their city sank into the sea. Since then, Robogorg believes all organic life have no purpose other than to serve him and his machines due to their emotions. While he uses other Matroids to fight for him, he is not above getting personally involved if it benefits his desire to gather data on his opponents. Using his creations to gather intel on the Goseigers, Robogorg eventually moves in to finish them off by using Brajira to seal their Tensouders and Leon Cellular. However, Brajira secretly ensured the latter device remained functional, allowing Gosei Knight to foil Robogorg's plot to kill the Goseigers. Robogorg enlarges and attempts to use his self-destruct function to destroy the Goseigers, only to be scrapped by Gosei Ultimate. While his head survives and orders Brajira to repair him, the latter obliterates him instead.

His most powerful attacks are the  cannon, an all-out attack that causes earthquakes and can only be used once, and the  self-destruct function, which has enough power to destroy a continent.

Metal Alice
 is Robogorg's basket star-themed personal attendant, a Matrintis marshal, and the first high-spec Matroid that Robogorg created. Amidst Matrintis' battles with the Goseigers, she develops a rivalry with Gosei Knight, but loses Robogorg's favor following Wonder Gosei Great defeating her. As a result of the latter event, he installs a Punishment Bomb into her to stop her from failing him again. After reviving Brajira as Buredo-RUN, who later saves her, Metal Alice takes interest in the concept of friendship and realizes the Goseigers cannot be underestimated. Upon learning Robogorg only kept her around to perfect Buredo-RUN, Metal Alice restores the latter's full memories and conspires with him to eliminate Robogorg. During Robogorg's final battle with the Goseigers, he orders Buredo-RUN to become a suicide bomber, but Metal Alice takes Buredo-RUN's place, taking a kill shot from Super Gosei Red in order to detonate her Punishment Bomb. While she narrowly survives, Buredo-RUN destroys her.

Matroids
The  are the Matrintis Empire's robotic soldiers programmed to follow three protocols: conquer humans, punish humans, and protect themselves from any hostility. Their full name refers to their model type and main functionality. With the use of Metal Alice's Bibi Nails, the Matroids are able to enlarge.

: A scallop-themed Matroid able to create a shield from surrounding materials. He is sent to capture humans, only to be defeated by the Super Goseigers, enlarged by Metal Alice, and scrapped by Gosei Ultimate.
: An upgraded version of Zan-KT with blasters in place of his shield ability. Zan-KT2 is defeated by the Super Goseigers and Gosei Knight, enlarged by Metal Alice, and scrapped by Gosei Ultimate and Gosei Ground. Zan-KT2 is voiced by Taketora.
: Three mass-produced Matroids that combine attributes of the previous models, though the Goseigers and Gosei Knight easily destroy them.
: A prototypical version of Zan-KT of the Shield. Zan-KT0 is deployed to destroy the Negakure Temple and obtain the power source Metal Alice detected within it. However, he is defeated by the time-travelling Gokaigers, enlarged by Metal Alice, and scrapped by GouZyuJin. Zan-KT0 appears exclusively in the Kaizoku Sentai Gokaiger episode "The Future is in the Past".
: A copepod-themed Matroid able to fly at blinding speeds and perform the  attack. He is sent to gather humans for labor, only to be defeated by the Super Goseigers, enlarged by Metal Alice, and scrapped by Ultimate Gosei Great.
: A cuttlefish-themed Matroid sent to find and capture physically fit humans in order to convert into cyborg soldiers, only to be defeated by Super Gosei Black and Gosei Knight, enlarged by Metal Alice, and scrapped by Ultimate Gosei Great.
: A coral-themed Matroid with optical camouflage technology that allows him to disguise himself as a human in a pink rabbit suit. He is sent to test his petrifying Vital Meter on humans in a scheme to ensure Matrintis' human slaves are less likely to rebel. He is defeated by Super Gosei Yellow, enlarged by Metal Alice, and scrapped by Gosei Ultimate.
 : A horseshoe crab-themed Matroid capable of rewinding time by 10 seconds via his  ability. Metal Alice sends him to lure the Goseigers into a trap so Buredo-RUN can destroy them. After she enlarges him to cover Buredo-RUN, Bakutofuji-ER battles Gosei Ultimate and Gosei Ground. Unbeknownst to Metal Alice however, Buredo-RUN fires a beam into the Matroid and mechas' colliding attacks, which causes a time warp that sends Alata and Bakutofuji-ER back in time and shrinks the Matroid. They eventually return to the present, where Bakutofuji-ER is re-enlarged by Metal Alice and scrapped by Ground Gosei Great.
 : A starfish-themed Matroid that Metal Alice designs to help her understand the concept of friendship and equipped with a remote-controlled , which has a 300-meter blast radius. She leaves him in Eri's care, with the Gosei Angel nicknaming him "Koro". While Ain-I learns much about humanity and friendship, Metal Alice deems the experiment a waste of time, wipes his memory, and activates his battle mode to destroy the Goseigers. Metal Alice enlarges Ain-I and activates the Alice Bomb. Eri uses Gosei Ultimate to transport Ain-I into the stratosphere, but he reactivates and knocks her away before exploding.
While Saroge-DT overpowers the Goseigers, Gosei Blue uses his Camoumirage Card to throw the Matroid off-guard before the Super Goseigers and Gosei Knight defeat him. Metal Alice enlarges the Matroid, but he is scrapped by Datas Hyper and Gosei Ultimate.

Other Matroids
 : An octopus-themed Matroid who creates the  team through analysis of the Goseigers' data and abilities. Estworl-D appears exclusively in the series' tie-in stage show.

Earth Salvation Plan
The  is the name of an operation and movement launched by Brajira to destroy the Earth based in the Matrintis Empire's underwater base Terminel, renamed , and serves as the final villain faction faced by the Goseigers.

Brajira

Brajira was originally the most powerful of the ancient Gosei Angels, able to use all three elements at once after killing his teammates to take their powers for his own. While working undercover within the Yuumajuu as Buredoran of the Chupacabra, he sealed their leaders Makuin and Kinggon within the Erurei Box and became obsessed with his mission as a Gosei Angel to the point of fashioning the Earth Salvation Plan to destroy the world and remake it in his own image. To this end, Brajira used the incomplete  Tensou Technique to travel from his time to the present, which mutated him. As the Warstar had just arrived on Earth as well, Brajira joined them as Buredoran of the Comet and provided them with his inventions - the Bibi Soldiers and the Bibi Bugs - along with his knowledge of the Gosei Angels to manipulate Warstar into disabling his former allies with the intention of disposing of the aliens personally once the job was done.

When the Goseigers defeat Warstar however, Brajira unseals the Yuumajuu's leaders and returns to their ranks to continue his fight against the Goseigers, though he briefly returns to Warstar when their remnants come to Earth to destroy it. After losing the Abare Headder to the Goseigers, Brajira falls out of favor with the lead Yuumajuu and attempts to eliminate them and the Goseigers simultaneously, only to be killed by them.

During the events of the crossover film Tensou Sentai Goseiger vs. Shinkenger: Epic on Ginmaku, Brajira revives himself as Buredoran of Chimatsuri, assumes leadership of the Gedoushu, and brainwashes Shinken Red in a scheme to transfer the Sanzu River's waters into the Gosei World. However, the Goseigers and Shinkengers join forces to kill him once more.

Amidst their own battles with the Goseigers, the Matrintis Empire find Brajira's near-lifeless body, rebuild him as Buredo-RUN of the Cyborg, and remove most of his memories. Robogorg intends to use Brajira's powers to seal the Goseigers' Tensouders, but Metal Alice takes pity on Brajira and restores his memories. With this, Brajira destroys Robogorg and Metal Alice before temporarily going into hiding to restore his original mutated form. Upon resurfacing and revealing his true identity to the Goseigers, Brajira captures and reprograms Gosei Knight to serve him while using Warstar's military might, the Yuumajuu's magic, and the Matrintis Empire's technology to enact the Nega End Ceremony. He battles the Goseigers a final time before using the last of his Dark Gosei power to activate the ceremony, intending to take Earth with him. However, the Goseigers use the Gosei Global technique to foil his plans.

Additionally, he mastered the forbidden  Tensou Technique, which allows the user to resurrect Earth's creatures, and used it as the basis for the  technique, which has the opposite effect and causes a mass extinction.

Throughout the series, Brajira wears different armor to fit into several villainous organizations as their strategists and substitute leaders. He can also produce duplicates of his past forms and/or use the Camoumirage Tensou Technique to shapeshift between them.

: Brajira's treehopper-themed form, which he first assumed after he traveled to the present and joined the Warstar in their attack against Earth, fighting the Goseigers personally whenever their Tensou Techniques or weaknesses are exploited.
: Brajira's house centipede-themed form, which he assumed while operating as the Yuumajuu's strategist. In this form, he wields the  claws.
: Brajira's antlion-themed form that resembles the Gedoushu's fallen leader, Doukoku, which he used to assume leadership of the Gedoushu during the events of Tensou Sentai Goseiger vs. Shinkenger: Epic on Ginmaku. In this form, Brajira wields a broadsword similar to Doukoku's Shōryū Bakuzantō and can perform the  attack.
: Brajira's ammonite-themed Matroid form.

Bibi
The poisonous, cycloptic, bat-like  are living products of the dark aspects of previous alien races that Warstar conquered. They are usually deployed to enlarge targets, both living creatures and inanimate objects such as the Erurei Box alike. By merging with dolls, the Bibi Bugs transform into the humanoid , armed with various weapons to support the evil organizations that Brajira aligns himself with. Over the course of the series, Brajira keeps the Bibi Bugs' hive in order to utilize them for Warstar and the Yuumajuu until Kinggon takes it. Following the Yuumajuu's death, Metal Alice claims the hive and modifies the Bibi Bugs into Bibi Nails for the Matrintis Empire's purposes.

While most of the Bibi Bugs are destroyed following Brajira's death, during the events of the special Tensou Sentai Goseiger Returns, one surviving specimen called the  possesses Yumeko Hoshino in an attempt to seek revenge on the Goseigers and feed on the darkness in humans' hearts. He gains the ability to evolve into a humanoid form called , but the Goseigers foil his plans before destroying him with Ground Gosei Great.

Dark Headders
Similarly to the Gosei Angels, Brajira utilizes , multi-headed monsters meant to become wedges as part of their master's  ceremony. Like normal Headders, the Dark Headders can also serve as armaments. They are each based on two mythological beasts and one weapon, and named after a fantasy film series, with the heads' individual names divided in Japanese by the interpunct.

They possess incredible teamwork and regenerative properties unless their horns are cut off simultaneously.

Guest characters
Prior to the beginning of the series, Magis was killed by Kurasunigo of the 5000°C after the former sacrificed himself to save Hyde.

Spin-off exclusive characters
After arriving on Earth, Gyōten'ō swallows the horn to ensure the end of the world, gaining the ability to resurrect deceased Warstar members in the process. Despite damaging the Dragon Headder, he is killed by Wonder Gosei Great, which shatters the horn in the process.
: A , Gyōten'ō's right-hand man, and one of the last remaining members of Warstar following Mons Drake's destruction who wields the twin  katars and appears exclusively in Tensou Sentai Goseiger: Epic on the Movie. He assists his commanding officer until he is killed by the female Goseigers.

Notes

References

Bibliography

See also

Super Sentai characters